Combinatorial commutative algebra is a relatively new, rapidly developing mathematical discipline. As the name implies, it lies at the intersection of two more established fields, commutative algebra and combinatorics, and frequently uses methods of one to address problems arising in the other. Less obviously, polyhedral geometry plays a significant role.

One of the milestones in the development of the subject was Richard Stanley's 1975 proof of the Upper Bound Conjecture for simplicial spheres, which was based on earlier work of Melvin Hochster and Gerald Reisner. While the problem can be formulated purely in geometric terms, the methods of the proof drew on commutative algebra techniques.

A signature theorem in combinatorial commutative algebra is the characterization of h-vectors of simplicial polytopes conjectured in 1970 by Peter McMullen. Known as the g-theorem, it was proved in 1979 by Stanley (necessity of the conditions, algebraic argument) and by Louis Billera and Carl W. Lee (sufficiency, combinatorial and geometric construction). A major open question was the extension of this characterization from simplicial polytopes to simplicial spheres, the g-conjecture, which was resolved in 2018 by Karim Adiprasito.

Important notions of combinatorial commutative algebra 

 Square-free monomial ideal in a polynomial ring and Stanley–Reisner ring of a simplicial complex.
 Cohen–Macaulay ring.
 Monomial ring, closely related to an affine semigroup ring and to the coordinate ring of an affine toric variety.
 Algebra with a straightening law. There are several versions of those, including Hodge algebras of Corrado de Concini,  David Eisenbud, and Claudio Procesi.

See also 

 Algebraic combinatorics
 Polyhedral combinatorics
 Zero-divisor graph

References 

A foundational paper on Stanley–Reisner complexes by one of the pioneers of the theory:
 Melvin Hochster, Cohen–Macaulay rings, combinatorics, and simplicial complexes. Ring theory, II (Proc. Second Conf., Univ. Oklahoma, Norman, Okla., 1975), pp. 171–223. Lecture Notes in Pure and Appl. Math., Vol. 26, Dekker, New York, 1977.

The first book is a classic (first edition published in 1983):
 Richard Stanley, Combinatorics and commutative algebra. Second edition. Progress in Mathematics, 41. Birkhäuser Boston, Inc., Boston, MA, 1996. x+164 pp. 

Very influential, and well written, textbook-monograph:
 Winfried Bruns; Jürgen Herzog, Cohen–Macaulay rings. Cambridge Studies in Advanced Mathematics, 39. Cambridge University Press, Cambridge, 1993. xii+403 pp. 

Additional reading:
 Rafael Villarreal, Monomial algebras. Monographs and Textbooks in Pure and Applied Mathematics, 238. Marcel Dekker, Inc., New York, 2001. x+455 pp. 
 Takayuki Hibi, Algebraic combinatorics on convex polytopes, Carslaw Publications, Glebe, Australia, 1992
 Bernd Sturmfels, Gröbner bases and convex polytopes. University Lecture Series, 8. American Mathematical Society, Providence, RI, 1996. xii+162 pp. 
 Winfried Bruns, Joseph Gubeladze, Polytopes, Rings, and K-Theory, Springer Monographs in Mathematics, Springer, 2009. 461 pp. 

A recent addition to the growing literature in the field, contains exposition of current research topics:

 Ezra Miller, Bernd Sturmfels, Combinatorial commutative algebra. Graduate Texts in Mathematics, 227. Springer-Verlag, New York, 2005. xiv+417 pp. 
 Jürgen Herzog and Takayuki Hibi, Monomial Ideals. Graduate Texts in Mathematics, 260. Springer-Verlag, New York, 2011. 304 pp.

Commutative algebra
Algebraic geometry
Algebraic combinatorics